Ian Charter MacLaurin, Baron MacLaurin of Knebworth  (born 30 March 1937) is a British businessman, who has been chairman of Vodafone and chairman and chief executive of Tesco. He is a former chairman of the England and Wales Cricket Board, a former president of the Marylebone Cricket Club and a former Chancellor of the University of Hertfordshire.

He was a Conservative member of the House of Lords from 1996 until his retirement in 2017.

Early life
Ian MacLaurin was born in 1937 in Blackheath, Kent. He attended Shrewsbury House School and Malvern College.

Career

Tesco
MacLaurin joined Tesco in 1959 as a management trainee, then held a number of more senior appointments in its retail operations before being appointed to its Board in 1970. He was appointed managing director in the 1970s and became chairman in 1985.

By the time of his retirement in 1997 Tesco had overtaken Sainsbury's to become the largest UK retailer. MacLaurin led Tesco away from the "pile it high, sell it cheap" business philosophy of founder Jack Cohen. He has claimed his most important act was appointing the right successor, Terry Leahy.

Vodafone
MacLaurin joined Vodafone as a non-executive director in 1997, becoming chairman in July 1998. He stepped down on the merger with AirTouch Communications Inc in 1999, resuming his role a year later.

Upon his retirement from the board in July 2006, he became an adviser to the company. He was succeeded as chairman by Sir John Bond. He also became chairman of the Vodafone Group Foundation, an independent charitable trust set up to administer charitable and other donations on behalf of the company.

Cricket
MacLaurin has always been enthusiastic towards sports. At Malvern College, he played in the First XI. In his 20s, he played Minor Counties cricket for Hertfordshire. From 1997 until 2002 he was the Chairman of the England and Wales Cricket Board and is now Chairman of the Sport Honours Committee. MacLaurin was President of the Marylebone Cricket Club from 1 October 2017 to 30 September 2018.

His son Neil MacLaurin has played first-class and List A cricket for Middlesex, as well as Minor Counties and List A cricket for Hertfordshire.

Other
MacLaurin is a supervisory board member of Heineken International.

MacLaurin has been a Chancellor of the University of Hertfordshire. He is currently the chairman of the college council of Malvern College.

He is the president of The Enterprise Forum, a not-for-profit organisation that organises meetings between business and the Coalition government.

Lord MacLaurin is also chairman of Paperless Receipts Ltd, a company whose system (eReceipts) powers the digital receipts and customer engagement programmes for retailers such as Argos, Monsoon Accessorize and northern UK supermarket Booths.

Lord Maclaurin is Honorary Life President of Hope for Tomorrow, a UK charity dedicated to bringing cancer care closer to patients' homes via Mobile Cancer Care Units (MCCUs).

Honours
He was elected a Fellow of the Royal Society of Arts (FRSA) in 1986. He was knighted in 1989, and raised to the peerage for life in 1996 taking the title Baron MacLaurin of Knebworth, of Knebworth in the County of Hertfordshire. He served as a Deputy Lieutenant of the County of Hertfordshire from 1992-2001 and for Wiltshire from 2002-2012. This gives him the Post Nominal Letters "DL" for Life.  He was awarded Honorary Life Membership of the Marylebone Cricket Club in 2005.

References

External links
TheyWorkForYou.com: keeping tabs on the UK's parliaments and assemblies: Lord MacLaurin of Knebworth

1937 births
Chancellors of the University of Hertfordshire
English businesspeople
Maclaurin of Knebworth
People educated at Malvern College
British businesspeople in retailing
Living people
Chairmen of Tesco
Chairmen of Vodafone
Deputy Lieutenants of Wiltshire
Deputy Lieutenants of Hertfordshire
English cricketers
Hertfordshire cricketers
Knights Bachelor
British chief executives
British chairpersons of corporations
People from Blackheath, London
People from Knebworth
Presidents of the Marylebone Cricket Club
Life peers created by Elizabeth II